Ivan Reitman  (October 27, 1946February 12, 2022) was a Czechoslovak-born Canadian filmmaker. He was best known for his comedy work, especially in the 1980s and 1990s. He was the owner of The Montecito Picture Company, founded in 1998.

Films he directed include Meatballs (1979), Stripes (1981), Ghostbusters (1984), Ghostbusters II (1989), Twins (1988), Kindergarten Cop (1990), Dave (1993), and Junior (1994). Reitman also served as producer for such films as National Lampoon's Animal House (1978), Space Jam (1996), and Private Parts (1997).

Early life

Ivan Reitman was born in the predominantly ethnic Hungarian town of Komárno (known as Komárom in Hungarian), Czechoslovakia (now Slovakia), on October 27, 1946, the son of Klara (Raab) and Ladislav "Leslie" Reitman. Both of Reitman's parents were Jewish; his mother survived the Auschwitz concentration camp, and his father was an underground resistance fighter. His family arrived in Canada as refugees when Reitman was four years old. Reitman attended Oakwood Collegiate in Toronto and was a member of the Twintone Four singing group. He attended McMaster University, receiving a Bachelor of Music in 1969. At McMaster he produced and directed many short films.

Career

Reitman's first producing job was with the then-new station CITY-TV in Toronto. CITY was also the home of the first announcing job of his later friend and collaborator Dan Aykroyd. However, Reitman's tenure at CITY was short and he was fired during his first year by station owner Moses Znaimer.

In Toronto, he produced the stage production Spellbound (1973) which evolved into Broadway production The Magic Show.

Reitman's first commercial film ventures were as producer of two films for director David Cronenberg, Shivers (1975) and Rabid (1977). His big break came when he produced National Lampoon's Animal House in 1978 and directed Meatballs in 1979. From there, he directed and produced a number of comedies including Stripes (1981), Ghostbusters (1984), Legal Eagles (1986), Twins (1988), Ghostbusters II (1989), Kindergarten Cop (1990), Dave (1993), Junior (1994), Six Days, Seven Nights (1998), Evolution (2001), My Super Ex-Girlfriend (2006), and No Strings Attached (2011).

In the early 1990s, Reitman began to direct fewer films, but increased his role as a producer and executive producer through his company, Northern Lights Entertainment. He helped to produce the animated film Heavy Metal (1981), as well as the live-action films Spacehunter: Adventures in the Forbidden Zone (1983), Beethoven (1992), Beethoven's 2nd (1993), Space Jam (1996), Howard Stern's film Private Parts (1997)

In 1998, Reitman founded The Montecito Picture Company, a film production company located just south of Santa Barbara. In 2007, Reitman was inducted into Canada's Walk of Fame.

He next produced the comedy I Love You, Man (2009), starring Paul Rudd and Jason Segel. Also in 2009, he produced the Academy Award-nominated film, Up in the Air, directed by his son Jason Reitman. Later, Reitman had planned to direct the erotic thriller Chloe (2009), but he couldn't attract the cast he wanted; so Reitman decided to only serve as a producer and asked Atom Egoyan to direct the film. Chloe has since enjoyed commercial success and became Egoyan's biggest moneymaker ever.

In his final decade, Reitman also co-produced the biographical film Hitchcock, released on November 23, 2012, directed the 2014 sports drama Draft Day, starring Kevin Costner, and served as executive producer on 2021's Space Jam: A New Legacy as he had done for the first film.

In mid-January 2019, news of a new Ghostbusters film, Ghostbusters: Afterlife, came through with Ivan's son Jason Reitman taking over as co-writer and director. Ivan remained producer, and stood in for Ramis as Egon Spengler using digital makeup. The film was released on November 19, 2021, marking his final film before his death.

Unmade projects

In the early 1980s, Tom Mankiewicz wrote a script for a film entitled The Batman, with Reitman attached to direct. He planned to cast Meatballs star Bill Murray as Batman, David Niven as Alfred Pennyworth, William Holden as Commissioner James Gordon, and singer David Bowie as Joker. Following the deaths of Holden and Niven and rewrites of the script, Reitman left the project and was replaced by Gremlins director Joe Dante, but the film was never made.

In April 1996, it was reported that Reitman was attached to produce, and possibly direct, a Wonder Woman film. However, three years later, he passed the project on to writer Jon Cohen and left for unknown reasons.

In 2000, Reitman along with Wolfgang Petersen, Rob Reiner, M. Night Shyamalan, Alan Parker, Tim Robbins, Terry Gilliam, Brad Silberling and Peter Weir were considered to direct Harry Potter and the Philosopher's Stone but the directing job was given to Chris Columbus instead.

In March 2007, New York magazine, citing no sources, stated that Sony Pictures Entertainment wanted to replace Reitman on Ghostbusters III with a younger director, but that Reitman's original contract precluded this. In early 2010, it appeared as if Reitman would direct the film, but in September 2014, after Harold Ramis' death, Paul Feig was officially set to direct a new film, which was released in 2016 as a reboot of the franchise.

In March 2012, it was reported that a sequel of Twins, entitled Triplets, was in the works, and that Reitman would co-produce the film. Deadline reported in September 2021 that Reitman would both direct and produce Triplets and that shooting was scheduled to begin in January 2022. The status of the film is unclear following Reitman's death.

In 2013, it was revealed that Reitman had plans to make a sequel to Evolution, but they never came to fruition.

In June 2016, it was reported that Reitman would produce a prospective animated series Ghostbusters: Ecto Force. In July 2017, Reitman stated that Ecto Force had been postponed to focus on an animated Ghostbusters film that he would produce and co-direct alongside Fletcher Moules.

Personal life and death

Reitman married Geneviève Robert in 1976. He had two daughters and a son, Jason, who is a film director best known for his films Juno, Thank You for Smoking, Up in the Air and Ghostbusters: Afterlife. His daughter Catherine is the creator, executive producer, writer and star of the CBC comedy series Workin' Moms. His other daughter, Caroline, attended Santa Barbara City College. He and his French-Canadian wife, who converted to Judaism, brought up their children in the same tradition.

In 2009, he was made an Officer of the Order of Canada "for his contributions as a director and producer, and for his promotion of the Canadian film and television industries". In April 2011, he received the Mayor's Prize at his native city of Komárno, Slovakia.  He received the Queen Elizabeth II Diamond Jubilee Medal in 2012.

In 2014, he said "I've always been something of a conservative-slash-libertarian." Reitman had previously appeared in the 2004 documentary, Rated R: Republicans in Hollywood.

Reitman died in his sleep at his home in Montecito, California, on February 12, 2022, at the age of 75.

Filmography

Film

Producer only

Executive producer only

Television

Producer only

Executive producer only

Music videos

References

External links
 
 

1946 births
2022 deaths
Canadian expatriate film directors in the United States
Film producers from Ontario
Canadian libertarians
Canadian people of Slovak-Jewish descent
Canadian Screen Award winners
Canadian male screenwriters
Comedy film directors
Fantasy film directors
Horror film directors
Action film directors
Czechoslovak emigrants to Canada
Czechoslovak Jews
English-language film directors
McMaster University alumni
Film directors from Toronto
Jewish Canadian filmmakers
Officers of the Order of Canada
People from Komárno
Reitman family
Slovak film directors
Writers from Hamilton, Ontario
Writers from Toronto
20th-century Canadian screenwriters
20th-century Canadian male writers
21st-century Canadian screenwriters
21st-century Canadian male writers